Into the Pandemonium is the second studio album by Swiss extreme metal band Celtic Frost, released in 1987. It is the first album to feature bassist and backing vocalist Martin Eric Ain, who appeared on 1984's Morbid Tales EP, but not the band's previous album.

The album is more varied than Celtic Frost's past LPs, with unlikely covers (Wall of Voodoo's "Mexican Radio"), emotionally charged love songs, the album's recurring industrial-influenced rhythmic songs of demons and destruction, traditional Frost-styled songs about dreams and fear, and a dark, classical piece with female vocals.

Content

The album is vastly different from the band's previous work which cemented its late 1980s avant-garde metal term; it is also a departure from the style found on the band's previous albums, Morbid Tales and To Mega Therion that Celtic Frost had become known for. However, it does have the recurring symphonic elements found on previous albums. The album has a more classic heavy metal style within the songs with elements of industrial, classical, gothic rock and doom metal.

One in Their Pride, an industrial-oriented track, is built around various Apollo samples.

Some of the lyrics are silently borrowed from other sources. For example, significant portions of Inner Sanctum are directly quoted from Emily Brontë poems, while the lyrics to "Tristesses de la lune" are borrowed from the poem of the same name in Charles Baudelaire's Les Fleurs du mal. The lyrics to "Sorrows of the Moon" are an English translation of the same.

The track "Rex Irae" is the opening part of Celtic Frost's requiem; the third, concluding part of which, "Winter (Requiem, Chapter Three: Finale)" can be heard on 2006's Monotheist. The second part of the requiem was never released by the band. Thomas Gabriel Fischer has performed the whole piece, with the long missing second part ("Grave Eternal"), at Roadburn 2019 with Triptykon along with the Metropole Orkest. A registration of this performance has been released.

Album art
The cover image is a detail from the right (Hell) panel of The Garden of Earthly Delights, a triptych painted in 1504 by Hieronymus Bosch, now part of the permanent collection at the Prado in Madrid.

Track listings

Original LP

Original CD

1999 remastered CD edition bonus tracks

Personnel
Celtic Frost
Thomas Gabriel Warrior – vocals, guitars, synthesizers, effects
Martin Eric Ain – bass, effects, backing vocals
Reed St. Mark – drums, percussions, synthesizers, effects, backing vocals

Additional musicians (CD editions)
Manü Moan (The Vyllies) – vocals (track 4)
Andreas Dobler – guitars (tracks 9, 10, 14, 15)
Lothar Krist – orchestral arrangements, conductor (tracks 4, 10, 11)
Malgorzata Blaiejewska Woller, Eva Cieslinski – violins (tracks 4, 10, 11)
Wulf Ebert – cello (tracks 4, 10, 11)
Gypsy- viola (tracks 4, 10, 11)
Anton Schreiber – French horn (tracks 10, 11)
Thomas Berter – backing vocals (track 1)
Claudia-Maria Mokri – backing vocals (tracks 2, 5, 10)
H.C. 1922 – backing vocals (track 8)
Marchain Regee Rotschy – backing vocals (track 13)

Production
Celtic Frost – producers
Jan Nemec – engineer, sample editing (tracks 7, 12)

Reaction and legacy

Eduardo Rivadavia of AllMusic called Into the Pandemonium "one of the classic extreme metal albums of all time."

In 2021, it was elected by Metal Hammer as the 2nd best symphonic metal album of all time.

"Inner Sanctum" was featured in the 2009 video game Grand Theft Auto IV: The Lost and Damned.

References

Celtic Frost albums
1987 albums
Noise Records albums
Musical settings of poems by Charles Baudelaire
Combat Records albums